Gillersheim is a village with approximately 1,000 inhabitants in southern Lower Saxony. Gillersheim belongs to the Gemeinde (municipality) of Katlenburg-Lindau and to the Landkreis (district) of Northeim. The village celebrated 900 years of existence in 2005 and is known for its numerous social activities. The inhabitants are called “Kuckucks”.

References

External links 
 Gillersheim
 Gillersheim.com

Villages in Lower Saxony